Macfie or MacFie is a surname of Scottish origin. The name is derived from the Gaelic Mac Dhuibhshíthe, which means "son of Duibhshíth" (or alternately MacDhubhshith, "son of Dubhshithe"). This Gaelic personal name is composed of two elements: dubh "black" + síth "peace". The earliest record of the surname is of Thomas Macdoffy, in 1296.

Uses of the name

People 
 Bruce Macfie, (born 1978), Australian, professional middleweight kickboxer.
 Robert Andrew Macfie, (1811–1893), Scottish, businessman and Member of Parliament.
 Paula Noel Macfie, (born 1969), Scots-Irish American, advocate, public speaker, philosopher, author, educator and genealogist.
 John McPhee, (born 1931 ), Irish American, author.

Other 
 Clan Macfie, Scottish clan historically located on the island of Colonsay in the Hebrides.

References